Broughty Ferry Pier railway station served the suburb of Broughty Ferry, Dundee, Scotland from 1848 to 1887 on the Dundee and Arbroath Railway.

History 
The station opened on 17 May 1848 by the Dundee and Arbroath Railway. It was situated on the harbour pier at Broughty Ferry castle. The station closed on 1 June 1878 upon opening of the Tay Railway Bridge. It reopened following collapse of the Tay Railway bridge and station again closed to both passengers and goods traffic in 1887 when the railway bridge reopened.

References

External links 

Disused railway stations in Dundee
Railway stations in Great Britain opened in 1848
Railway stations in Great Britain closed in 1878
Railway stations in Great Britain opened in 1880
Railway stations in Great Britain closed in 1887
1848 establishments in Scotland
1887 disestablishments in Scotland
Former Dundee and Arbroath Railway stations